Verco may refer to:

James Crabb Verco (1814–1891), builder and politician in South Australia
Joseph Cooke Verco (1851-1933), Australian physician and conchologist
Peta Verco (born 1956), Australian women's cricketer
Verco Medal awarded by the Royal Society of South Australia
Verco Building, first re-inforced concrete "skyscraper" in Adelaide, South Australia
Walter Verco, Sir Walter John George Verco, KCVO (1907–2001)

See also
Vercoe (disambiguation)